Unforgettable is a CD released by the Fullerton College Jazz Bands and Jazz Singers for the Discovery Records Trend AM-PM label.  The current #1 jazz band on this recording was the winner of the 1985 International Association for Jazz Education Disneyworld Competition and the opening band for the 1985 Playboy Jazz Festival.

Background 
In 1981 the Music Department at Fullerton College built a 16 track in house recording facility which was to serve as a teaching tool for both student music groups and students wanting to take recording technology classes at a vocational level.  Unforgettable is the fourth of many albums to come out of this studio to feature the award-winning Fullerton College Jazz Band.  The CD contains tracks from three of the Fullerton College jazz groups: Jazz Band I, Jazz Band II, Vocal Jazz.  The recording also includes Fullerton College Jazz Band I on 3 tracks from the 1982 LP release Escape To Asylum that were re-mastered for digital release.  This same year the Fullerton College Jazz Band won the Pacific Coast Collegiate Jazz Festival in May and was the Hennessey Jazz Search winner being given the honor of playing at the Playboy Jazz Festival in June.
 
Albert Marx, who was the owner of Discovery Records/Trend Records AM-PM label, became very impressed with the band two years earlier and the level of the music coming from the jazz groups at Fullerton College.   He decided to support the younger, up and coming jazz students/players from the greater Los Angeles/Southern California region by producing certain LPs and CDs.  Jazz critic Leonard Feather did the liner notes for the CD booklet of Unforgettable, "...I can only offer my congratulations on a job superbly done.  In a word Unforgettable."

Track listing

Recording Sessions 

 Recorded March 1–3, 1985, Fullerton College, Fullerton, California

Personnel

Musicians 
Conductors: Terry Blackley and James Linahon
Sax (guest soloist): Ernie Del Fante
Trumpet (guest soloist): James Linahon
Saxes and woodwinds: Steve Villa, Jack Cooper, Sarah Kibby Underwood, Harold Manning, Edmund Velasco, Dave Kraus, George Reynoso, Doug Gregan, Steve Page, Luis Segovia, Russell Burt, Yancey Valdez, Dan Freidman, Todd Senn, John Fullerton
Trumpets and flugelhorns: John Deemer, Phillip Wightman, Mike Schwartz, Tim Grindheim, Steve Mattox, Rick Jacobsen, Mark New, Brett Pallet, Jon Aranda, Dave Brown, Tom Cameron, Mark Hough, Mark Hudson
Trombones: Tim Hoff, Tom Griffith,  Wendell Kelly, Bob Heller, Pat Aranda, Rick Acosta, Bruce Lansford, Brent Touminen, Frank Payan, Christine Harms, John Shideler
Guitar: Bruce Wall, Jordan Woodruff, Dave Bastien
Piano: John Karlson, Joe Van Gilder, Michael Levan
Bass: Tom Nunes, Carol Chapin, Todd Kreutzer
Drums: Kelly Small, Vince Dublino, Eugean Ermel
Percussion: Pat Ready, Mike Sosnkowski
Vocal Jazz: Patty Figueroa, Rhonda Voorhees, Dorraine Metzger, Sylvia Engle, Terri Peralta, Kerstin Klopsch, Mark Henson, Harlan Harris, Ed McCormick, Seth Weiss, Bruce Hart, Eric Jens

Production 
Recording, mixing, re-mixing: James Linahon, Terry Blackley, Alex Cima, Wade McDaniel, Roger Myers
Mastering: Bernie Grundman
Album design: Graham Booth, Fullerton College Art Department

Reception 

"...(Fullerton College) deserve(s) an A for effort on their UNFORGETTABLE album. Everything is done very well, and the arranging, especially, shows that a lot of care went into this recording..."

Bob Rusch, Cadence Magazine

References

External links

1985 albums
Fullerton College Jazz Band albums